Ennichi no Tatsujin (縁日の達人, lit. "Festival Master") is a video game for Nintendo's Wii console. It was a launch title in Japan.
The game is composed of several minigames, all of which revolve around Japanese festivals. This is Namco's first Wii game. It is a spin-off the Taiko no Tatsujin series.

Modes 
The game is composed of nine games in one single game. The Wii Remote is used by itself for majority of the games. The games are listed below:

Kingyo Sukui: A game which uses virtual net to grab goldfish from a tank.
Shateki: a game to fire as much possible bottles with a gun.
Takoyaki: a game to flip as much possible Takoyaki balls over.
Darts: Throw darts, striking targets in the specified order.
Balloon Art: Use the Wii Remote and Nunchuk to twist a balloon into shapes. Movements must be timed to coincide with the background music.
Yo-yo Tsuri: The Wii Remote is used to aim a paper string and hook onto balls in a bucket of water. The trick is to keep the string from tearing apart.
Wanage: A game of ring toss to grab prizes. 
Uranai no Yakata: This is a fortune tellers house. The Wii Remote and Nunchuk are used to make a pair of virtual hands grasp a crystal fortune ball and hear a fortune for the day. 
Crepe: A game where players are required to meet a target number of crepes, using the exact toppings only requested by the customers.

Reception
On release week, Famitsu gave the game a 27 out of 40 (7/7/6/7).

References

2006 video games
Party video games
Wii-only games
Japan-exclusive video games
Video games developed in Japan
Video games set in Japan
Wii games